Mountview Academy of Theatre Arts, formerly Mountview Theatre School, is a drama school in Peckham, south London, England, founded in 1945. The Academy provides specialist vocational training in acting and musical theatre, as well as production arts. The President of the school is Dame Judi Dench, and the Principal and Artistic Director Stephen Jameson.

History
Mountview was founded in Crouch End, north London, in 1945 by Peter Coxhead and Ralph Nossek as "The Mountview Theatre Club", an amateur repertory company staging a new production for a six-day run every second week. Among the club's productions were Coxhead's staging of Eugene O'Neill's Mourning Becomes Electra, a production of the complete Arnold Wesker Trilogy – Chicken Soup with Barley, Roots and I'm Talking about Jerusalem directed by Peter Scott-Smith – and Buttered Both Sides, a revue written and composed by Mountview member Ted Dicks and directed by Gale Webb, which later transferred to the Fortune Theatre in London's West End.

Early in 1946, when 21 years old, Coxhead borrowed £2,300 to buy the lease of Cecile House, a large derelict property at Crouch End. Development at Cecile House included the conversion of a gymnasium into what became the Mountview Theatre.

The Mountview Theatre officially opened in November 1947 with a production of The Importance of Being Earnest. The theatre presented one play each month until 1949, after-which Coxhead bought the building outright from the leaseholders. For the next 25 years the theatre staged a new production every two to three weeks. Ralph Nossek went on to pursue a professional acting career in 1955 that lasted 56 years.

Acting courses and technical theatre skills training were introduced part-time from 1958 when Mountview Theatre School was formally recognised in name. Its first president was George Norman, with Coxhead as its principal. This remained the case for the next ten years.

In 1969 the school began full-time drama courses.  In 1971 a second performance space was built and opened as the Judi Dench Theatre. There were also 10 working studios for acting students, three for technical students and a wardrobe with more than 15,000 costumes. By 1985 the school had leased additional premises at Wood Green, that were named the Sir Ralph Richardson Memorial Studios.

Coxhead retired as Principal in 1996; he was replaced by Paul Clements, former Director of Drama at the Royal Welsh College of Music and Drama. Peter Coxhead became Chairman and Chief Executive of the school board until 2000 when Mountview Theatre School changed its name to the Mountview Academy of Theatre Arts, In 2001 Coxhead was awarded an MBE for Services to the Arts. He died in 2004 after 59 years involvement with the school.

Paul Clements remained as principal until 2008 when he was replaced by Sue Robertson, previously Dean of the School of Arts at City University London, subsequently replaced by Stephen Jameson in 2014. He was previously Associate Director at LAMDA.

In 2007 the British reality television show E4 School of Performing Arts offered several would-be actors the chance to win scholarships to Mountview, Italia Conti and the Academy of Contemporary Music. Mountview's Director of Acting Programme, Amir M. Korangy, appeared on the show as part of the panel.

In 2011 Mountview Principal Robertson announced plans to relocate to part of Hornsey Town Hall in Crouch End, a stone's throw from Crouch Hill where it was founded, opening there for the 2014–15 academic year. A Multi-use regeneration was planned for the Grade II-listed Town Hall and the site to its rear, a £19 million project. Haringey Council's cabinet approved the plan on 26 April 2011 on the basis of a business case that included Mountview. The plan fell through when Mountview withdrew and in 2016 Mountview received planning permission for a new site in Peckham, south-east London. The new building opened in September 2018.

Full-time courses

Foundation

Foundation course in Musical Theatre
Foundation course in Acting

Undergraduate

FdA in Theatre Production Arts
BA Hons in Performance (Acting)
BA Hons in Performance (Actor Musician) 
BA Hons in Performance (Musical Theatre)
BA Hons in Theatre Production Arts

Postgraduate

MA/PG Diploma in Performance (Acting)
MA/PG Diploma in Performance (Musical Theatre)
MA/PG Diploma in Theatre Directing
MA/PG Diploma in Musical Direction
MA in Creative Producing
MA in Theatre, Community and Education
MA in Site-Specific Theatre Practice

Short courses

3 Week Musical Theatre Boot Camp
3 Week Acting Summer Master Class
Community Outreach Program
Haringey Young Peoples Bursary
Young Peoples Classes
Young Peoples Summer School

Presidents
George Norman 1958–1969
Dame Margaret Rutherford 1969–1972
Sir Ralph Richardson 1972–1983
Sir John Mills 1983–2005
Dame Judi Dench 2006 -

Principals
Peter Coxhead 1958–1996
Paul Clements 1996–2008
Sue Robertson 2008–2013

Notable alumni

Kelly Adams
Mina Anwar
Julie Atherton
Glynis Barber
Alecky Blythe
Jonathan Butterell
Lois Chimimba
Lindsey Coulson
Brendan Coyle
Josh Dallas
Tim Downie
Tim Dutton
Sally Dynevor
Justin Edwards
Michael Fentiman
Connie Fisher
Edward Hall
Steve Halliwell
Louisa Harland
Douglas Henshall
Amanda Holden
Jim Howick
Tyrone Huntley
Ibinabo Jack
Dean John-Wilson
Leanne Jones
Ayub Khan-Din
Rowena King
Eddie Marsan
Leigh Lawson
Twiggy Lawson
Nick Moran
Craig Parkinson
Stuart Matthew Price
Sharon Small
Enzo Squillino Jnr
Rhashan Stone
Ken Stott
Giles Terera
Rebecca Trehearn
Denise Welch
Laurence Mark Wythe

References

Sources

External links

Official website
The Board of Mountview Academy of Theatre Arts
Mountview Academy of Theatre Arts Senior Staff

 
Education in the London Borough of Haringey
Drama schools in London
Wood Green
Education in the London Borough of Southwark